An election to Leitrim County Council took place on 27 June 1991 as part of that year's Irish local elections. 22 councillors were elected from four electoral divisions by PR-STV voting for a five-year term of office.

Results by party

Results by Electoral Area

Ballinamore

Carrick-on-Shannon

Dromahaire

Manorhamilton

External links
 Official website
 Irishelectionliterature

1991 Irish local elections
1991